Paramysis nouveli is a species of mysid crustacean, found in marine shallow-water habitats in Western Europe.

References

Mysida
Crustaceans of the Atlantic Ocean
Crustaceans described in 1953